Sea of Fear is a 2006 film about a group of people on a boat who fall victim to a killing spree. Directed by Andrew Schuth, it was released on DVD on August 22, 2006. The film is rated PG-13 by the MPAA.

Plot
Four friends take a vacation on a boat, with its skipper and three crew.  By a campfire one night, the seven discuss the kind of death each fears most. One by one, each of the party is killed by the method he fears most.

References

External links 
 
 

2006 films
2006 horror films
American independent films
2000s English-language films
2000s American films